This is a list of NJPW Strong special episodes, detailing all professional wrestling television special cards promoted by New Japan Pro-Wrestling of America (NJPWoA). The episodes are branded, usually 3–4 weeks at a time, to mimic the normal touring schedule of the main promotion. Prior to September 2021, other episodes before these events were mainly branded as "Road to" shows.

Special episodes

See also 
 List of major NJPW events

Notes

References

External links 
 Official website

New Japan Pro-Wrestling
New Japan Pro-Wrestling shows
Professional wrestling-related lists